Tandovo is a lake in Barabinsky District, Novosibirsk Oblast, south-central Russia.

Its waters are slightly saline. The Sugun Peninsula is a tongue of land projecting into the northern end of the lake from the northeastern shore. It is a protected area where rare plants grow .

Geography
With an area of  Tandovo is one of the largest lakes in Novosibirsk Oblast. It is located in the Baraba Lowland, southern sector of the West Siberian Plain,  SW of Barabinsk.

The Tandovka river flows into the eastern shore of the lake. Its waters freeze in early November and the lake stays under ice until May.

See also
list of lakes of Russia

References

External links
 
Полуостров Сугун озера Тандово

Lakes of Novosibirsk Oblast
West Siberian Plain